Banbury, also informally known as Banbury and North Oxfordshire, is a constituency in Oxfordshire created in 1553 and represented in the House of Commons of the UK Parliament since 2015 by Victoria Prentis of the Conservative Party. She currently serves as Attorney General for England and Wales.

In terms of electorate, Banbury was the 16th largest constituency in the United Kingdom at the time of the 2015 general election.

Constituency profile 
The constituency has relatively high economic dependence on agriculture, as well as modern industry (particularly motorsport), research and development, public services and, to a lesser extent, defence. It contains two large market towns, Banbury and Bicester, where the majority of the electorate live. It is a partly rural seat, with the northwest of the constituency on the edge of the Cotswolds. The area has experienced significant urban growth and is popular with commuters who favour its fast transport links to Birmingham, Oxford and London by rail, or the M40. More than one in 10 of the population is employed in higher managerial, administrative and professional work, according to ONS 2011 Census figures for England and Wales. In 2015 the seat was home to 4.3% of EU residents and unemployment was 2.9%. There are some Labour voting wards in Banbury itself, but the remainder of the constituency including Bicester and the smaller rural towns and villages are safely Conservative. However, the 2017 election saw a particularly strong swing for Labour like many towns in southern England. Nonetheless, the Conservative incumbent Victoria Prentis managed to secure a majority of over 12,000, increasing this to nearly 17,000 in 2019.

History

Content and regional context
The constituency was created as a parliamentary borough, consisting of the town of Banbury, on 26 January 1554 through the efforts of Henry Stafford and Thomas Denton. It was one of the few in England in the unreformed House of Commons to elect only one Member of Parliament (MP). It as such used the first past the post system. It was the seat represented by Lord North, the prime minister during the American War of Independence.

Under the Redistribution of Seats Act 1885, the Parliamentary Borough was abolished and was reconstituted as the Northern or Banbury Division of Oxfordshire when the three-member Parliamentary County of Oxfordshire was divided into the three single-member seats: Banbury, Woodstock and Henley. It comprised the north-western part of Oxfordshire, including Chipping Norton as well as the abolished borough.  Banbury has remained as such since then with varying boundaries (see below).

Political history
Majority views
Banbury has post-World War I unbroken Conservative representation and significant local support for the party. Its MPs since 1922 have all served long terms in office and each since 1922 has been knighted.  The seat saw a very close election in 1923. The largest vote since 1922 has at each election been for a Conservative. In 2010 Tony Baldry (Conservative) almost doubled his majority. The 2015 result made the seat the 125th safest of the Conservative Party's 331 seats by percentage of majority.

In June 2016, an estimated 50.35% of local adults voting in the EU membership referendum chose to leave the European Union instead of to remain. This was matched in two January 2018 votes in Parliament by its MP.

Other parties
Four of the six parties' candidates achieved more than the deposit-retaining threshold of 5% of the vote in 2015. In 2001, the Labour Party candidate Lesley Silbey won the largest opposing-party share of the vote since 1974 — 35% of the vote.  Prior to 1974, the highest percentage of votes for the second-placed candidate was in 1945 — 48% of the vote.

Boundaries and boundary changes

1885–1918: The Borough of Banbury, and the Sessional Divisions of Banbury and Bloxham, Chadlington, and Wootton North.

1918–1950: The Boroughs of Banbury, Chipping Norton, and Woodstock, the Urban District of Witney, and the Rural Districts of Banbury, Chipping Norton, Witney, and Woodstock.

The constituency was expanded to include the western half of the abolished Woodstock Division, including Witney and Woodstock.

1950–1974: The Boroughs of Banbury, Chipping Norton, and Woodstock, the Urban District of Witney, the Rural Districts of Banbury, Chipping Norton, and Witney, and in the Rural District of Ploughley the parishes of Begbroke, Gosford and Water Eaton, Hampton Gay and Poyle, Kidlington, Shipton on Cherwell, Thrupp, and Yarnton.

Change to contents due to reorganisation of rural districts.  Marginal loss to the Oxford constituency as a result of the expansion of County Borough of Oxford.

1974–1983: The Boroughs of Banbury, Chipping Norton, and Woodstock, the Urban District of Bicester, the Rural Districts of Banbury and Chipping Norton, and in the Rural District of Ploughley the parishes of Ardley, Bucknell, Caversfield, Chesterton, Cottisford, Finmere, Fringford, Fritwell, Godington, Hardwick with Tusmore, Hethe, Kirtlington, Launton, Lower Heyford, Middleton Stoney, Mixbury, Newton Purcell with Shelswell, Somerton, Souldern, Stoke Lyne, Stratton Audley, and Upper Heyford.

The Urban and Rural Districts of Witney and the parts of the Rural District of Ploughley, including Kidlington, formed the basis of the new County Constituency of Mid-Oxon.  Bicester and northern parts of the Rural District of Ploughley transferred from Henley.

1983–1997: The District of Cherwell wards of Adderbury, Ambrosden, Ardley, Bicester East, Bicester South, Bicester West, Bloxham, Bodicote, Calthorpe, Chesterton, Cropredy, Deddington, Easington, Fringford, Grimsbury, Hardwick, Heyford, Hook Norton, Hornton, Kirtlington, Launton, Neithrop, Otmoor, Ruscote, Sibford, Steeple Aston, and Wroxton, and the District of West Oxfordshire wards of Bartons and Tackley, and Wootton.

Gained a small part of the abolished County Constituency of Mid-Oxon, to the south of Bicester. The bulk of the area comprising the former Urban and Rural Districts of Chipping Norton transferred to the new County Constituency of Witney.

1997–2010: The District of Cherwell wards of Adderbury, Ambrosden, Ardley, Bicester East, Bicester South, Bicester West, Bloxham, Bodicote, Calthorpe, Chesterton, Cropredy, Deddington, Easington, Fringford, Grimsbury, Hardwick, Heyford, Hook Norton, Hornton, Kirtlington, Launton, Neithrop, Otmoor, Ruscote, Sibford, Steeple Aston, and Wroxton.

Minor loss to Witney, comprising the two wards in the District of West Oxfordshire.

2010–present: The District of Cherwell wards of Adderbury, Ambrosden and Chesterton, Banbury Calthorpe, Banbury Easington, Banbury Grimsbury and Castle, Banbury Hardwick, Banbury Neithrop, Banbury Ruscote, Bicester East, Bicester North, Bicester South, Bicester Town, Bicester West, Bloxham and Bodicote, Caversfield, Cropredy, Deddington, Fringford, Hook Norton, Launton, Sibford, The Astons and Heyfords, and Wroxton.

Two wards in the District of Cherwell to the south of Bicester (Kirtlington and Otmoor) transferred to Henley.

The constituency currently covers the north-east of Oxfordshire, around Banbury and Bicester and largely corresponds to the Cherwell local government district, with the principal exception of the large village of Kidlington on the outskirts of Oxford which lies in the Oxford West and Abingdon constituency, and some smaller villages to the north-east of Oxford that lie in the Henley constituency.

Members of Parliament

Banbury borough (until 1885)

MPs 1554–1640
Constituency created 1554. (Even before the Reform Act of 1832, Banbury only returned one member to Parliament)

MPs 1640–1885

Banbury division of Oxfordshire/Banbury County Constituency (since 1885)

Elections

Elections in the 2010s

Elections in the 2000s

Elections in the 1990s

Elections in the 1980s

Elections in the 1970s

Elections in the 1960s

Elections in the 1950s

Election in the 1940s

General Election 1939–40:
Another General Election was required to take place before the end of 1940. The political parties had been making preparations for an election to take place from 1939 and by the end of this year, the following candidates had been selected; 
Independent Progressive: Patrick Early

Elections in the 1930s

Election in the 1920s

Election in the 1910s

General Election 1914–15:
Another General Election was required to take place before the end of 1915. The political parties had been making preparations for an election to take place and by July 1914, the following candidates had been selected; 
Liberal: Eustace Fiennes
Conservative:

Elections in the 1900s

Elections in the 1890s

Elections in the 1880s

Elections in the 1870s

Elections in the 1860s

Elections in the 1850s

 Caused by Tancred's resignation.

Elections in the 1840s

Elections in the 1830s

Neighbouring constituencies

Banbury is bordered to the north-east by Northamptonshire South, to the east by Buckingham, to the south by Witney and Henley constituencies, to the east by Stratford-upon-Avon and to the north-east by Kenilworth and Southam.

See also
 List of parliamentary constituencies in Oxfordshire
 Henley
 Oxford East
 Oxford West and Abingdon
 Wantage
 Witney
 History of Banbury, Oxfordshire

Notes

References

Sources

Robert Beatson, A Chronological Register of Both Houses of Parliament (London: Longman, Hurst, Res & Orme, 1807)  A Chronological Register of Both Houses of the British Parliament, from the Union in 1708, to the Third Parliament of the United Kingdom of Great Britain and Ireland, in 1807
 Stanley T. Bindoff et al. (1982). The House of Commons: 1509 – 1558 ; 1, Appendices, constituencies, members A – C, Volume 4. Boydell & Brewer. . pp. 30–31.
D Brunton & D H Pennington, Members of the Long Parliament (London: George Allen & Unwin, 1954)
F W S Craig, British Parliamentary Election Results 1832–1885 (2nd edition, Aldershot: Parliamentary Research Services, 1989)
 The Constitutional Year Book for 1913 (London: National Union of Conservative and Unionist Associations, 1913)

|-

Parliamentary constituencies in Oxfordshire
Constituencies of the Parliament of the United Kingdom established in 1553
Parliamentary constituency
Constituencies of the Parliament of the United Kingdom represented by a sitting Prime Minister